Micah Cooks (born February 7, 1981) is a former American soccer player who played for D.C. United in the MLS. He is the younger brother of fellow professional soccer player Judah Cooks.

Career statistics

Club

Notes

References

1981 births
Living people
American soccer players
Association football midfielders
Association football forwards
D.C. United players
MLS Pro-40 players
Northern Virginia Royals players
Major League Soccer players
USL Championship players
USL Second Division players